Rakesh Kumar (born 13 January 1985) is an Indian Paralympian archer competing in the Men's Individual Compound Open. He represented India at the 2020 Summer Paralympics, held in Tokyo, Japan. He won a gold medal in the men's compound open section of the 7th Fazza Para Archery World Ranking Tournament, which was held in Dubai in February 2021. Kumar is the highest-ranked compound archer in India with a world rankings of No. 11.

Rakesh was part of the team that won a gold medal in the team competition at the European Circuit 2nd leg in the year 2018 and won a bronze medal in the mixed team event at the 5th Fazza Para Archery World Ranking Tournament in the year 2019.

He was trained at the Shri Mata Vaishno Devi Shrine Board's Sports Complex and he is native of Katra, Jammu. In September 2021, the Lieutenant Governor of the Union Territory of Jammu and Kashmir, Manoj Sinha felicitated Rakesh Kumar for his performance in the 2020 Tokyo Paralympics.

See also 
 India at the 2020 Summer Paralympics

References 

Living people
1985 births
Archers at the 2020 Summer Paralympics
Paralympic archers of India
Paralympic medalists in archery